Mulholland Highway is a scenic road in Los Angeles County, California, that runs approximately 50 miles through the western Santa Monica Mountains from near US Route 101 (Ventura Freeway) in Calabasas to Highway 1 (Pacific Coast Highway) near Malibu at Leo Carrillo State Park and the Pacific Ocean coast – at the border of Los Angeles and Ventura Counties.

Mulholland Highway is the western rural portion and, with the eastern Mulholland Drive portion, is a scenic route named after Los Angeles civil engineer William Mulholland and built throughout the 1920s "to take Angelenos from the city to the ocean".

Only the segment of Mulholland Highway between Pacific Coast Highway and Kanan Dume Road, and through Malibu Creek State Park between Cornell Road and Las Virgenes Road, is officially recognized by the California Department of Transportation as under the California Scenic Highway System, meaning that it is a substantial section of highway passing through a "memorable landscape" with no "visual intrusions", where the potential designation has gained popular favor with the community.

Geography
The name Mulholland Highway applies to a thirty-mile stretch that starts near Louisville High School in Calabasas and extends to its westernmost terminus at Leo Carrillo State Park on the Pacific Coast Highway. Wholly contained within Los Angeles County, the scenic byway was formally opened in 1928. Mulholland zigzags through the Santa Monica Mountains – one of the Southern California Transverse Ranges – from Oxnard all the way to Hollywood. Original major intersections included Topanga Road, Cornell Road, Latigo Canyon Road, and Decker Road.

The route provides access, directly or en route, to many of the regional parks in the Santa Monica Mountains National Recreation Area.

Running east-west along the spine of the Santa Monicas, Mulholland Highway makes its way through the mountains without benefit of tunnels. There are several automobile wrecks and fire-burnt structures that litter the bottoms of the canyons through which Mulholland Highway passes . The native flora of the Santa Monica Mountains are seen throughout the scenic route.

Mulholland Drive

In the early 1970s, five thousand local activists successfully prevented the cement paving of most of the Mulholland Drive stretch. This section, known as "Dirt Mulholland," is only open to cyclists and pedestrians. From Mulholland Bridge east, a cemented Mulholland Drive winds through the affluent Hollywood Hills to Mulholland Drive's easternmost terminus at Cahuenga Boulevard, near Universal Studios. It then becomes Mulholland Highway again as an unpaved footpath to Griffith Park.

See also

Malibu Creek State Park
The Rock Store

References

External links

 
Roads in Los Angeles County, California
Roads in Ventura County, California
Santa Monica Mountains
State Scenic Highway System (California)
Landmarks in Los Angeles
Named highways in California